Candles in the Dark is a 1993 American made for television Christmas drama film directed by Maximilian Schell. Produced for The Family Channel, the film stars Alyssa Milano and Chad Lowe.

Plot
When her father thinks she is too spoiled, he sends Sylvia to her aunt in Estonia. She soon finds herself engulfed in a struggle with her father, and finds herself being hunted by the KGB. Meanwhile, after she meets Jaan, Sylvia immediately falls in love with him. Together, they fight to keep the Christmas spirit alive in the dark and old fashioned city.

Cast
Alyssa Milano as Sylvia Velliste
Chad Lowe as Jaan Toome
Natalya Andrejchenko as Marta Velliste
 as Pastor Harma
Maximilian Schell as Colonel Arkush
Aleksey Petrenko    
Gita Ränk as Tiina  
Helena Merzin as Natasha Omeltchenko  
Lembit Ulfsak as  Gospodin Omeltchenko
Mart Sander as the resistance fighter
Hendrik Toompere Sr.
Andres Puustusmaa  
Salme Reek    
Elle Kull
Maria Avdjuško

Production
The film was shot between August and September 1993 on location with an Estonian crew, most of whom did not speak English. According to the Los Angeles Times, this was the first non-Estonian film to be shot in Estonia. Maximilian Schell looked back on production and the crew: "They would say 'yes' to everything. Sometimes it would fit and sometimes it wouldn't. Our time was very short with the sound and music, all of the coordination. It was a lot to do in such a short period of time."

The version aired on the Family Channel was not Schell's final cut. He planned on buying the film's rights to distribute a re-edited version overseas, but this never happened.

Reception
Variety magazine wrote: "Candles in the Dark is a sweet, endearing but safe story that occasionally suffers from low production values and muddled sub-characters but will no doubt make the family weep."

See also
 List of Christmas films

References

External links

1993 television films
1993 films
1990s Christmas drama films
American Christmas drama films
Films directed by Maximilian Schell
Films set in Estonia
Films shot in Estonia
Christmas television films
American drama television films
1990s English-language films
1990s American films